Withiel is a civil parish and village in mid Cornwall, England, United Kingdom. The parish of Withiel is between the parishes of St Breock, Lanivet, Roche and St Wenn. The name Withiel comes from the Cornish word Gwydhyel, meaning "wooded place". The parish contains the hamlets of Withielgoose, Retire and Tregawne; the parish had a total population of about 300 in 1824.

At Ruthernbridge is an early 15th-century bridge with two pointed arches over the Ruthern. The hamlet here was until 1933 a halt on the Bodmin to Wadebridge railway line. The River Ruthern rises near Victoria in the parish of Roche and flows northwards through the parish of Withiel; it flows into the River Camel one kilometre above Brocton.

Notable people from the parish include Sir Bevil Grenville (1596–July 5, 1643), a Royalist soldier in the English Civil War.

Local government
Withiel Parish Council is the lowest level of government in the parish, its powers are limited, most functions are administered by Cornwall Council or by central government. The parish council is made up of 7 councilors and the clerk. As of 2017 these were: Anna Hoyle, David Cubitt, Guy Nott Bower, Janet Shearer, Patrick Malone, Simon Coy, Eric Harper and the clerk Robin Turner. They meet at the village hall.

Church history

The parish church, dedicated to St Clement, is in the village of Withiel and dates back to the 13th century. The original church was apparently a nave and chancel only but it was rebuilt in the 15th and 16th centuries in granite. At this time a tower and spacious south aisle were added, and later a smaller north aisle, used as a chapel by the Bevilles of Brynn. The dedication to St Clement is not recorded before 1478; St Clement is portrayed on the font which is of this date. The church and manor of Withiel belonged before the Norman Conquest to the monastery of Bodmin; the monastery retained possession until 1538. The benefice was never appropriated and has always been a rectory. Thomas Vivian, Prior of Bodmin, was also rector 1523-1533; his arms are in the east window of the south aisle.

There are two Cornish crosses and a cross base in the parish. One of the crosses is at a road junction about a mile south of the churchtown and the other in the rectory garden. The latter formerly stood in the road outside the rectory but was moved into the garden about 1860; it is in a good state of preservation. The former cross is called Inches Cross; it is thought that most of the cross shaft is buried in the ground.

The Rev. Sir Vyell Donnithorne Vyvyan, 9th Baronet (1826–1917) was Rector of Withiel. His father the Rev. Vyell Francis Vyvyan (1803–77) was also rector of Withiel, for 50 years.

References

External links

 Withiel Parish Council

Civil parishes in Cornwall
Villages in Cornwall